The following is a list of 1989 Seattle Mariners draft picks. The Mariners took part in the June regular draft, also known as the Rule 4 draft. The Mariners made 70 selections in the 1989 draft, the first being right-handed pitcher Roger Salkeld in the first round. In all, the Mariners selected 30 pitchers, 14 outfielders, 11 shortstops, 5 catchers, 5 first basemen, 4 third basemen, and 1 second baseman.

Draft

Key

Table

References
General references

Inline citations

External links
Seattle Mariners official website